Saskia Ozols is an American artist and art educator residing in New Orleans, Louisiana.  She is the daughter of artist Auseklis Ozols.  In addition to certificates from the New Orleans Academy of Fine Arts and the Pennsylvania Academy of Fine Arts, she holds a master of fine arts degree from the latter institution.   She has added her husband's family name to her own, and is now known as Saskia Ozols Eubanks.

Exhibitions
Saskia Ozols' work has been exhibited in a number of locations including: Women With Guns in 2006, Poesis expo at Sören Christensen and Artists' House in Philadelphia. She has also judged an exhibit at the Poydras Home Art Show in 2007.

References

External links
 Saskia Ozols on New Orleans Academy of Fine Arts site
 Saskia Ozols Loyola University New Orleans

American art educators
Living people
American women painters
21st-century American women artists
Year of birth missing (living people)

https://64parishes.org/entry-image/saskia-arranging

 https://leh.org

 All rights reserved by Auseklis Ozols. The Louisiana Endowment has included this work in 64parishes.org for the purposes of criticism, comment, teaching, scholarship, educational research, all other nonprofit educational usages under Section 107 of the U.S. Copyright Act.